Steffen Puttkammer (born 30 September 1988) is a German professional footballer who plays for SV Meppen as a defender.

Career
Puttkammer began playing football at Heidmühler SV before moving on to VfB Oldenburg. In 2007, he moved to Oberliga side SV Wilhelmshaven where he played 22 matches in his debut season. A year later he joined BV Cloppenburg, but was dropped only two weeks later and subsequently joined FC Oberneuland who played in the Regionalliga Nord. Here Puttkammer played his first Regionalliga matches, before returning to Wilhelmshaven in 2009, after the club had won promotion to the Regionalliga. In the summer of 2013, Puttkammer joined 1. FC Magdeburg where he established himself in the first team, and eventually won promotion to the 3. Liga in the 2014–15 Regionalliga season. Puttkammer's good performances saw his contract extended by two years until June 2017.

Honours
SV Wilhelmshaven
 Lower Saxony Cup: 2006–07, 2009–10

1. FC Magdeburg
 Regionalliga Nordost: 2014–15
 Saxony-Anhalt Cup: 2013–14

References

External links
 
 

1988 births
Living people
People from Wilhelmshaven
German footballers
Footballers from Lower Saxony
Association football defenders
VfB Oldenburg players
BV Cloppenburg players
FC Oberneuland players
SV Wilhelmshaven players
1. FC Magdeburg players
SV Meppen players
3. Liga players
Regionalliga players